Våttahaugen is a small hill located on the Lade peninsula in Trondheim municipality in Trøndelag county, Norway. It is the highest point at Ladehammeren. The hill offers a scenic view of the surrounding area as well as other areas of the city of Trondheim and especially the coastal area along the Trondheimsfjord. There is a playground on Våttahaugen  and the area is surrounded by a small forest which leads to the area of Grønnlia.

During the World War II, Våttahaugen was a strategic location during the Nazi occupation of Norway. Våttahaugen was the site of a military installation and used as a site to control coastal traffic. Våttahaugen still has a lot of former bunker sites. Several of the houses around Våttahaugen were bombed  during the war.

References

External links 
 Lade and Lademoens history by Per Øverland

Mountains of Trøndelag
Geography of Trondheim